

Events
Bertran d'Alamanon criticises Charles of Anjou for planning to go on Crusade when he ought to be making good his claim on Provence

Births
 Philippe de Rémi (died 1296), French jurist, royal official and poet

Deaths

13th-century poetry
Poetry